The Carvalho worm lizard (Amphisbaena carvalhoi), also known commonly as Carvalho's worm lizard, is a species of worm lizard in the family Amphisbaenidae. The species is endemic to Brazil.

Etymology
The specific name, carvalhoi, is in honor of Brazilian herpetologist Antenor Leitão de Carvalho, who collected the type specimen.

Geographic range
A. carvalhoi is found in northeastern Brazil in the state of Pernambuco.

Habitat
The preferred natural habitat of A. carvalhoi is shrubland.

Description

Reproduction
A. carvalhoi is oviparous.

See also
List of reptiles of Brazil

References

Further reading
Gans C (1965). "On Amphisbaena heathi Schmidt and A. carvalhoi, new species, small forms from the northeast of Brazil (Amphisbaenia: Reptilia)". Proceedings of the California Acadademy of Sciences, Fourth Series 31 (23): 613–630. (Amphisbaena carvalhoi, new species, pp. 625–630 + Figures 7–12).
Gans C (2005). "Checklist and Bibliography of the Amphisbaenia of the World". Bulletin of the American Museum of Natural History  (289): 1–130. (Amphisbaena carvalhoi, p. 12).
Vanzolini PE (1974). "Ecological and geographical distribution of lizards in Pernambuco, northeastern Brazil (Sauria). Papéis Avulsos de Zoologia, Museu de Zoologia da Universidade de São Paulo 28 (4): 61-90.
Vanzolini PE (2002). "An aid to the identification of the South American species of Amphisbaena (Squamata, Amphisbaenidae)". Pap. Avul. Zool., Mus. Zool. Univ. São Paulo 42 (15): 351–362.

Amphisbaena (lizard)
Endemic fauna of Brazil
Reptiles of Brazil
Reptiles described in 1965
Taxa named by Carl Gans